Stitches is the seventh studio album by American band Califone. It was released in September 2013 under Dead Oceans.

Track listing

References

2013 albums
Dead Oceans albums
Califone albums